Ivan Ivanovich Krasko (born September 23, 1930) is a Soviet and Russian stage and film actor and writer. People's Artist of Russia (1992).

Biography
He studied acting at Russian State Institute of Performing Arts, graduating in 1961.

From 1961 to 1965 he was a member of the troupe at Tovstonogov Bolshoi Drama Theater in Leningrad. From 1965 to current he has been a member of the troupe at Komissarzhevskaya Theatre under the leadership of a notable director Ruben Agamirzyan. There his stage partners were such actors as Galina Korotkevich, Georgi Korolchuk, Stanislav Landgraf, Mikhail Khrabrov, Yelena Safonova, and Petr Shelokhonov.

His son, Andrey Krasko was also a notable Russian actor.

In 2009, Ivan Krasko co-authored a book of memoirs titled "My Вest Friend Petr Shelokhonov", where he wrote about his best friend Petr Shelokhonov and their partnership on stage, in films, and in life.

Filmography
In S. City (1966) – writer
The Prince and the Pauper (1972) – Miles Hendon
Squadron of Flying Hussars (1980) – colonel Ustimovich
True of Lieutenant Klimov (1981) – staff officer
Semyon Dezhnev (1983) – merchant Guselnikov
The Hobbit (1985) – Gandalf
The Last Road (1986) – captain Rakeyev
Mister Designer (1988) – servant
Afghan Breakdown (1991) – colonel Viktor Nikolayevich
A Beautiful Stranger (1992) – Grigori Rasputin
The White Horse (1993) – American
You Exist (1993) – traditional healer
Marigolds in Flower (1998) – bum
Streets of Broken Lights 2 (1999) – Pavel Levitin "Contrabass"
Empire Under Attack (2000) – elder Kondraty
Peculiarities of the National Hunt in Winter Season (2000) – Vladimir Lenin the rescuer
Little Longnose (2003) – the King (voice)
Alyosha Popovich and Tugarin Zmey (2004) – Svyatogor (voice)
Streets of Broken Lights 6 (2004) – Ivan Ivanovich
Brezhnev (2005) – collective farm chairman
Female Novel (2005) – Vladislav Petrovich
The Master and Margarita (2005) – taxi driver
Taras Bulba (2009) – Kasyan Bovdyug
Fortress of War (2010) – narrator
Peter the Great: The Testament (2011) – old man
The Admirer (2012) – Leo Tolstoy
The White Guard (2012) – Maksim

Awards and honors 

 Honored Artist of the RSFSR (December 20, 1976)
 People's Artist of Russia (February 21, 1992; first artist to receive that title)
 Order of Honour (2010)
 Jubilee Medal "70 Years of Victory in the Great Patriotic War 1941–1945"
 Golden Mask (2018)

Family 
 First wife (1951–1955) — Yekaterina Ivanova. One daughter Galina 
 Second wife (1956–1997) — Kira Petrova. Two children: son — actor Andrey Krasko, daughter Julia Svekrovskaya-Krasko (born 1966) 
 Third wife (2001–2011) — Natalia Vyal. Two sons: Ivan and Fyodor  
 Fourth wife (2015–2018) — Natalia Shevel (born 1990)

References

External links

Ivan Krasko on Kinopisk

1930 births
20th-century Russian male actors
21st-century Russian male actors
Living people
People from Leningrad Oblast
Communist Party of the Soviet Union members
Honored Artists of the RSFSR
People's Artists of Russia
Recipients of the Order of Honour (Russia)
Russian male film actors
Russian male stage actors
Russian male television actors
Russian male voice actors
Soviet male film actors
Soviet male stage actors
Soviet male television actors
Soviet male voice actors